Chostonectes is a genus of beetles in the family Dytiscidae, containing the following species:

 Chostonectes gigas (Boheman, 1858)
 Chostonectes johnsonii (Clark, 1862)
 Chostonectes maai Balke, 1995
 Chostonectes nebulosus (W.J. Macleay, 1871)
 Chostonectes sharpi Sharp, 1882
 Chostonectes wattsi Wewalka, 1994

References

Dytiscidae genera